Personality and Social Psychology Review is a quarterly peer-reviewed academic journal published by the Society for Personality and Social Psychology. It publishes review and meta-analytic articles on subjects like social cognition, attitudes, group processes, social influence, intergroup relations, self and identity, nonverbal communication, and social psychological aspects of affect and emotion, and of language and discourse. The current editors-in-chief are Heejung Kim and David Sherman (University of California, Santa Barbara). The journal is a member of the Committee on Publication Ethics.

Abstracting and indexing 
The journal is abstracted and indexed in the Social Sciences Citation Index. According to the Journal Citation Reports, its 2021 impact factor is  9.281.

References

External links

English-language journals
Social psychology journals
Personality journals
SAGE Publishing academic journals
Differential psychology journals
Academic journals associated with learned and professional societies